Píla (or ; ,) is a village and municipality in the Žarnovica District, Banská Bystrica Region in Slovakia. The village belonged to a German language island. The German population was expelled in 1945.

External links
http://www.statistics.sk/mosmis/eng/run.html

Villages and municipalities in Žarnovica District